Scissurella phenax is a species of minute sea snail, a marine gastropod mollusc or micromollusc in the family Scissurellidae, the little slit snails.

References

External links
 To World Register of Marine Species

Scissurellidae
Gastropods described in 2012